Aiyaary ( or trickery) is a 2018 Indian Hindi-language action thriller film written and directed by Neeraj Pandey. Produced by Shital Bhatia, Dhaval Gada & Motion Picture Capital and distributed by Reliance Entertainment, Plan C Studios, Friday Filmworks & Pen India Limited. The film features Sidharth Malhotra, Manoj Bajpayee, Rakul Preet Singh, Pooja Chopra, Adil Hussain, Kumud Mishra, Naseeruddin Shah and Anupam Kher. Inspired by the Adarsh Housing society scam, the film's narrative centers around the relation between a colonel and his protege that gets affected when the latter becomes disillusioned upon overhearing a conversation and goes rogue with sensitive data related to his covert organization, prompting the colonel to race against time and hunt him down.

After having its release date rescheduled from 26 January to 9 February to yet another week, it was released on 16 February 2018.

Plot

During a surveillance in South Block, New Delhi, Major Jai Bakshi (Sidharth Malhotra) overhears a conversation between Retired Lt. Gen Gurinder Singh (Kumud Mishra), an Indian Arms Lobby representative and the Army Chief Pratap Malik (Vikram Gokhale). Gurinder tries to bribe him on behalf of a Czech firm, but threatens to expose the DSD (Data & Systems Diagnostics), a confidential operations unit which Jai is a part of, when Malik doesn't comply. Suspecting a major scam in the army, Jai continues with the surveillance for 2 months before going rogue with his cyber-expert girlfriend Sonia (Rakul Preet Singh), taking along some information related to his organization. Colonel Abhay Singh (Manoj Bajpayee), Jai's mentor, learns of this and decides to pursue Jai while he's himself pursued secretly by Officer Brig. Srinivas (Rajesh Tailang) who reports his movements to Gurinder. After a meeting with Malik, who explains to him about the real culprit and a powerful arms dealer named Mukesh Kapoor (Adil Hussain), Abhay finds his car pursued and manages to escape while the pursuers sent by Srinivas keep following the car. The DSD shifts their location to an undisclosed location, and Gurinder enlists the help of a journalist named Kamya and provides her sensitive information that can expose the army's secrets. Abhay flies to London, and so does a disguised Jai who is picked up by Sonia upon his arrival.

In London, Jai manages to frighten Gurinder into transferring all his money into Jai's account while Abhay meets Tariq, a middle man for Intelligence agents, who arranges guns and tries to locate Jai and Sonia, eventually alerting Jai. A desperate Abhay meets Mukesh and tells him his agents have captured Gurinder. He makes a deal with him, telling him to kill Jai and Sonia in exchange for the information he possesses as it threatens both the parties. While Jai is en route to meet an MI-6 agent to sell him the information, Mukesh's sniper tries to kill him. A few agents are killed, and Jai is wounded, but manages to escape. Abhay picks up Sonia and calls Jai from her phone, telling him to come at a spot. Jai arrives, but is repeatedly punched by Abhay, who then holds him on gunpoint while Jai justifies his actions and questions what the elder generation plans to leave for the present one. This makes Abhay agree with him, and Jai tells Mukesh to free Tariq in exchange for all the information Jai would personally deliver to him. Abhay heads back to India, disguised, where he follows Jai's instructions and meets Baburao (Naseeruddin Shah), an old man who reveals about an army housing scam in Mumbai, involving Gurinder and the Defence Minister. Abhay records his statement and hands it over to Kamya, his ex-girlfriend, who decides to play it after listening to Baburao's words. Gurinder, rescued by Srinivas after capturing DSD agents, receives the same audio recording and shoots himself after listening to it.

The housing scam is exposed, due to which Srinivas is forced to free the captured DSD agents. The Indian Army and DSD's reputation is saved, while Jai goes to meet Mukesh. Right before entering the building, as he is being watched by Mukesh's agent, Jai decides not to hand over the information and disappears as a bus passes. Mukesh decides to let go, while Jai reunites with Abhay after 2 months.

Cast
 Sidharth Malhotra as Lieutenant Major Jai Bakshi / Abhimanyu Singh (Fake)
 Manoj Bajpayee as Lieutenant Colonel Abhay Singh
 Rakul Preet Singh as Sonia Gupta
 Pooja Chopra as Captain Maya Semwal
 Adil Hussain as Retd. Colonel Mukesh Kapoor
 Kumud Mishra as Retd. Lieutenant General Gurinder Singh
 Naseeruddin Shah as Baburao Shastri
 Anupam Kher as Tariq Ali
 Nivedita Bhattacharya as Kamya
 Kali Prasad Mukherjee as Bhima
 Vikram Gokhale as General  Pratap Malik, Chief of the Army Staff
 Rajesh Tailang as Brigadier K. Srinivas
 Juhi Babbar as the wife of Colonel Abhay Singh
 Maan Praveen Sirohi as Lieutenant Colonel Aubin Mathew
 Patrick Clarke as Roger

Production
The film was announced in April 2017. It was shot in Delhi, London, Kashmir, Cairo, Agra and more. Some of its scenes were also shot in the premises of Galgotias Campus One. Aiyaary is directed by Neeraj Pandey.

Music

The music of the film is composed by Rochak Kohli and Ankit Tiwari while lyrics are penned by Manoj Muntashir. The background score is composed by Sanjoy Chowdhury. The songs are sung by Sunidhi Chauhan, Palak Muchhal, Ankit Tiwari, Amit Mishra, Neha Bhasin and Rochak Kohli. The first song of the film, Lae Dooba, which is sung by Sunidhi Chauhan, was released on 29 December 2017. The second track of the film, Yaad Hai, which is sung by Palak Muchhal and Ankit Tiwari, was released on 17 January 2018. The third track of the film to be released was Shuru Kar which is sung by Amit Mishra, Neha Bhasin and Rochak Kohli and was released on 25 January 2018. The music album of the film includes 4 tracks and was released on 1 February 2018 at YouTube by Zee Music Company.

Release

Theatrical
The film was originally scheduled to be released on 26 January 2018, but this was moved in order to avoid a clash with Padmaavat. The film was then scheduled to be released worldwide on 9 February 2018 but was later postponed to 16 February 2018.

Home media
The film was released on DVD by Reliance Home Video & Games. The satellite rights were secured by Star Gold while the digital streaming rights went over to Netflix, where the film was released uncensored.

Reception

Critical response
The film received mixed to negative reviews from critics.

Alaka Sahani of Indian Express gave the film a rating of 2.5 stars out of 5 and said that "Even though the movie puts together an impressive ensemble cast comprising some of our best actors, it takes a lot of time to establish their characters. A veteran in Neeraj Pandey movies, Manoj Bajpayee carries the film on his shoulders." Bollywood Hungama gave the film a rating of 2 stars out of 5 and wrote "On the whole, AIYAARY misses the mark and is a huge letdown on the account of its flawed script and the lengthy runtime. At the box office, it will be a disappointing fare." Saibal Chatterjee of NDTV criticized the film, saying that, "Aiyaary, comatose and convoluted, is like a patient who's been wheeled in on a stretcher and declared dead on arrival. It never manages to get up on its feet and break into a saunter, let alone a sprint." and gave the film a rating of 1.5 stars out of 5. Rohit Vats of Hindustan Times gave the film a rating of 1 star out of 5 and said that, "Aiyaary is sketchily-written and not compelling. It tests patience even if you are a fan of the genre."

Shrishti Negi of News 18 gave the film a rating of 1.5 stars out of 5 and said that, "Unlike Pandey's other films, there is a nonsense of flatness in Aiyaary. Apart from a few scenes, the movie seems to be randomly constructed and fails to evoke any thrill."

See also 
 Adarsh Housing Society scam
 Tatra Truck scam

References

External links

 
 

2018 films
2010s Hindi-language films
2018 action thriller films
2010s chase films
Indian action thriller films
Indian chase films
Indian Army in films
Films shot in Delhi
Films shot in London
Films shot in Jammu and Kashmir
Films shot in Egypt
Reliance Entertainment films
Films about corruption in India
Films directed by Neeraj Pandey
Films scored by Sanjoy Chowdhury